Oldland is a village and civil parish in South Gloucestershire, England.  The parish includes the villages of Cadbury Heath and Longwell Green, and part of Willsbridge.  It does not include Oldland Common, which is in the parish of Bitton.

History 
Oldland was mentioned in the Domesday Book as Aldeland, the Saxon name for "old tract of land". Before the Norman Invasion of England, the overlord of Oldland was King Harold Godwinson, who had appointed Alwy as Lord of the area. After the conquest, King William I of England confiscated the land of Oldland and gave it to the Bishop of Exeter as tenant-in-chief. Oldland consisted of six houses with two plough teams. Oldland went through several variations of its name throughout history. Some of the names were Holande, Wholdland, Wooland during the reign of Queen Elizabeth I, Ouldland after the Restoration of the Monarchy and Eland.

Church 
Oldland had a chapel constructed in 1280. The chapel served the village as a part of the parish of Bitton with clergymen alternating services fortnightly between Oldland chapel and Hanham after performing services in the morning at Bitton's parish church. The churchyard contained a large yew tree which had been growing since the Tudor period. It remained standing until 2020 when it was blown down by a storm. In 1827, the medieval chapel was demolished following Oldland being made its own parish. The newly constructed St Annes Church was consecrated by the Bishop of Lichfield and the Bishop of Gloucester. In 1981, it was granted grade II listed building status by English Heritage. The church's vicarage and gateway were each granted separate grade II listings.

References

External links 
Parish Council website
St Anne's Parish Church, Oldland

External links

Villages in South Gloucestershire District
Civil parishes in Gloucestershire